Koning is the Dutch and Afrikaans word for "king" and thus may refer to the King of the Netherlands or the King of Belgium. Old spelling variations include Coning, Coninck, Köning, Koninck, Koningh, Konink, and Kooning.

"Koning" and "De Koning" are quite common Dutch surnames and may refer to:

Ans Koning (1923–2006), Dutch javelin thrower
Arthur Koning (1944–2015), Dutch rower
Christina Koning (b. 1954), British novelist and short story writer 
Elisabeth Koning (1917–1975), Dutch sprinter
Elisabeth Johanna Koning (1816–1887), Dutch painter
Gerry Koning (b. 1980), Dutch footballer
Hans Koning (1921–2007), Dutch writer
Henk Koning (1933–2016), Dutch tax official and politician
Henry Koning (b. 1960), Dutch sailor
Jacob Koning, alternate spelling of Jacob Koninck (c.1615–c.1695), Dutch painter (brother of Philips)
Jean Koning (b. 1976), Dutch actor, director, musician and author
Karen Koning AbuZayd (b. 1941), American diplomat
Marcel Koning (b. 1975), Dutch footballer
Martine Wittop Koning (1870–1963), Dutch nutrition expert and writer of cook books
Michel Koning (b. 1984), Dutch tennis player
Peter Koning (b. 1990), Dutch racing cyclist
Philips Koning, alternate spelling of Philips Koninck (1619–1688), Dutch painter (brother of Jacob)
Theo Koning (b. 1950), Dutch-born Australian painter
Victor Koning (1842–1894), French playwright and librettist

De Koning:
Bill DeKoning (1918–1979), American baseball catcher
Coen de Koning (1879–1954), Dutch medal-winning speed skater
Coen de Koning (b. 1983), Dutch sailor
Hans de Koning (b. 1960), Dutch football player and coach
Jan de Koning (1926–1994), Dutch government minister from 1977 to 1987
Jan de Koning (b. 1949), Dutch footballer
Louis de Koning (b. 1967), Dutch racing cyclist
Marcelien de Koning (b. 1978), Dutch medal-winning sailor
Mirjam de Koning (b. 1969), Dutch medal-winning swimmer
Peter de Koning (b. 1960), Dutch pop singer
Terry De Koning (b. 1961), Australian rules footballer for Footscray
Tom De Koning (b. 1999), Australian rules footballer for Carlton

De Koningh:
Leendert de Koningh (1777–1849), Dutch marine and landscape painter
Michael de Koningh (1958–2016), British music journalist

See also
De Coninck
De Koninck
Konings
Konink (disambiguation)
Kooning (disambiguation)
Koning en Koning, Dutch children's picture book

Dutch-language surnames